The Millsaps Majors is the nickname for the sports teams of Millsaps College in Jackson, Mississippi and their colors are purple and white. They participate in the NCAA's Division III and the Southern Athletic Association.

Men participate in baseball, basketball, cheerleading, football, soccer, tennis, golf, lacrosse, track and field, swimming and diving, and cross country. Women's sports include basketball, softball, soccer, tennis, golf, cross country, lacrosse, track and field, swimming and diving, and volleyball.

Football

Millsaps's all-time record in football is 380 wins, 356 losses and 36 ties (.516). The gridiron Majors have posted two undefeated regular seasons in their history (1980 & 2008), earned three NCAA playoff tournament berths (1975, 2006 & 2008) and claimed six Southern Collegiate Athletic Conference championships (1991, 1996, 2006, 2007, 2008 & 2009).

Baseball
2009 saw the Majors end the regular season with a 32–8 winning record (15–5 SCAC) and a SCAC West Division championship. On April 14, 2009, the Majors were named the No. 1 team in the country by D3baseball.com for the first time in the programs history. It was the first time any athletic team has achieved this high of a ranking.

Major League Baseball Draft
Millsaps has had 3 Major League Baseball Draft selections since the draft began in 1965.

Lacrosse
Both men and women began lacrosse teams in 2010.

Rivalries
The Majors had a fierce football and basketball rivalry with Mississippi College in nearby Clinton through the 1950s before competition was suspended after an infamous student brawl at a basketball game. Campus legend says the brawl was sparked by the alleged theft of the body of Millsaps founder Major Millsaps by Mississippi College students. The rivalry was considered by many as the best in Mississippi, featuring a prank by Mississippi College students who painted "TO HELL WITH MILSAPS" (sic) on the Millsaps Observatory. The football rivalry resumed in 2000 as the "Backyard Brawl", with games being held at Mississippi Veterans Memorial Stadium until 2006 when it was played at Robinson-Hale Stadium on the campus of Mississippi College. The rivalry took a one-year hiatus in 2005 but resumed in 2006.

NFL affiliation
Millsaps was the summer training camp home for the NFL's New Orleans Saints in 2006, 2007 and 2008.

References

External links